Jason Palumbis (born July 15, 1969) is a former American football quarterback.

Football career
Palumbis was a highly recruited quarterback from Lakeridge High School in Lake Oswego, Oregon who played college football at Stanford University. The 6' 3", 200 lb. Palumbis was Stanford's primary starting quarterback from 1988 to 1990. In 1990, he set Stanford's single-season completion percentage record (.686 on 234 completions out of 341 attempts), a record that still stands. After a slow start in the 1991 season, Palumbis lost the starting role to Steve Stenstrom.

1990 Big Game
Palumbis was Stanford's quarterback during one of Stanford's most dramatic comeback victories: the 93rd Big Game, played on November 17, 1990. In the game, which many Stanford fans consider to be the revenge for "The Play" eight years earlier, Stanford trailed 25–18 late in the game. With 12 seconds left, Palumbis threw a 19-yard touchdown pass to Ed McCaffrey to make the score 25–24. Stanford failed to convert the two-point conversion, and the Cal fans rushed the field, thinking the game to be all but over. Cal was penalized 15 yards for delay of the game while the field had to be cleared, and Stanford's Dan Byers recovered the ensuing onside kick. As Palumbis tried to get Stanford in field goal range, his pass to McCaffrey fell short, but a Cal defender was called for roughing Palumbis. Stanford kicker John Hopkins connected on a 39-yard field goal as time expired, giving Stanford the 27–25 victory.

After football
Palumbis played briefly for the San Antonio Force in the Arena Football League before retiring from football. He lives in West Linn, Oregon.

External links
AFL stats

References

1969 births
Living people
American football quarterbacks
Sportspeople from Lake Oswego, Oregon
Stanford Cardinal football players
San Antonio Force players
Players of American football from Oregon
Lakeridge High School alumni